The Gelidiales is a small order of red algae containing ten genera, and approximately 130–160 species, many of which are used to make agar.

References

External links
Tree of Life: Gelidiales

 
Red algae orders